Lois Ann Combs Weinberg (born December 18, 1943) is a politician and an advocate for improvements in public education in Kentucky. A native of the eastern region of Kentucky, Weinberg has served on the University of Kentucky Board of Trustees, the Kentucky Council on Postsecondary Education, and the Kentucky Prichard Committee for Academic Excellence.

In 2002, Weinberg won the Kentucky Democratic Party primary for United States Senate against Tom Barlow. She lost to incumbent Mitch McConnell in the November general election, 64.7%–35.3%.

Early life and education
Lois Combs Weinberg, the daughter of Bertam "Bert "T. Combs and Mabel Hall Combs. She was  born on December 18, 1943, in Lexington, Kentucky. Weinberg lived in Frankfort between 1959 and 1963.

Weinberg attended Randoph Macon Women's College and earned a BS in 1965, and a M Ed Harvard in 1996. Weinberg married Bill Weinberg and they have three children. After their marriage, the Weinbergs moved to Washington D.C. for a short time and then moved to Alice Lloyd College. In Washington, she worked at the Office of Economic Opportunity as an evaluator. In 1967, she worked in Lynchburg, West Virginia, on a Community Action Program (CAP).

Combs family political influence
Her father, an attorney, was first elected to the political office to the position of city attorney in Prestonsburg in 1950. Later that year, Governor Lawrence Wetherby appointed her father to fill a vacancy in the office of Commonwealth's Attorney for Kentucky's 31st Judicial District. In April 1951, Governor Wetherby appointed Combs to fill a vacancy on the Kentucky Court of Appeals. Later that year, he won a full eight-year term on the court.  In 1959, he was elected the 50th Governor of Kentucky. He was appointed to the  Sixth Circuit Court of Appeals by President Lyndon B. Johnson, serving from 1967 to 1970.

Education in Kentucky
Motivated by her own son's learning problems, Weinberg became an advocate for children with learning disabilities.  In 1979, Weinberg started a group offering tutorial services for children in Eastern region of Kentucky with dyslexia. This  eventually lead to a comprehensive program at the Hindman Settlement School. Weinberg was also part of a commission to study the state's future approach to education. She joined the board of the Hindman Settlement School in 1984.  Later Weinberg was the executive director of a non-profit organization, the Institute for Dyslexia Education in Appalachia (IDEA). She has served on the University of Kentucky board and the Council on Postsecondary Education. In 1986, she was appointed to the State Board of Education by Governor Martha Layne Collins, however, Weinberg turned the appointment down.

Weinberg is currently on the Board of IDEA: Center for Excellence, a non-profit organization focused on excellence in dyslexic services. She also works as a consultant for IDEA Academy at Carnegie Center for Literacy and Learning in Lexington, Kentucky.

United States Senate election, 2002
In 2002, Weinberg won the Kentucky Democratic Party primary for United States Senate against Tom Barlow. In the November general election, she lost to incumbent Mitch McConnell 64.7%–35.3%. A statewide advocacy group, The Women's Network, grew out of her former campaign.

References

External links 

 Lois Combs Weinberg (PBS video)

1943 births
Living people
Politicians from Lexington, Kentucky
Randolph College alumni
Activists from Kentucky
Kentucky women in education
Women in Kentucky politics
Harvard Graduate School of Education alumni
21st-century American women politicians
21st-century American politicians